American musician Randy Newman has released eleven solo studio albums, two live albums, six compilation albums, two extended plays (EPs), 15 singles, one musical, and 23 soundtrack albums.

Albums

Studio albums

Songbooks
New solo studio recordings of previously issued compositions.

Live albums

Compilation albums

Musical

Soundtracks

Other album appearances
Newman composed original songs that were used in the following films, but did not compose the scores for these films:

Newman also performed a song he did not write ("Gone Dead Train"), and conducted Jack Nitzsche's original music, for the soundtrack of the 1970 film Performance. In the following year, Newman's song "Let Me Go" was used in the film The Pursuit of Happiness.

Newman's song "I Love L.A." was used in The Naked Gun and Bean: The Ultimate Disaster Movie, and over the end credits of Volcano. Newman's 1972 song "Burn On" was used as the opening song in Major League (1989) while his song "Political Science" was featured in Blast from the Past (1999). Newman also covered the Fats Domino song "I'm In Love Again" for the soundtrack of Shag (1989).

Singles

Performed by Randy Newman

Written by Randy Newman
The following is a list of Randy Newman compositions that were chart hits for other artists.

Video albums
Live at the Odeon (1983) DVD with Ry Cooder and Linda Ronstadt
Sound Stage (2003) (featuring Lyle Lovett with Mark Isham and Randy Newman)

Notes

References

Discographies of American artists
Pop music discographies
Rock music discographies
Discography